"New Land" is a single by Swedish metal band Avatar off their sixth studio album Feathers & Flesh. It peaked at number 20 on the US Billboard Mainstream Rock Songs chart in 2017.

Background and concept
The song "New Land" comes from Avatar's studio album Feathers & Flesh, a concept album. The album's overarching concept is telling a fable-like story about an "owl who goes to war against the world to stop the sun from rising." Frontman Johannes Eckerstrom described how the song's message fit in to the overall narrative of the concept album:

The band released a music video for the song on 6 March 2017. Parting from the song's message in the concept album, the band is instead featured as exploring a fictional version of Trappist-1, and encountering unfriendly inhabitants there. Eckerstrom stated that the band agreed not to do any literal interpretations for any of the songs on the concept album, desiring to present the song's themes in a different light.

Personnel
 Johannes Eckerström - lead vocals 
 Jonas "Kungen" Jarlsby - guitars
 Tim Öhrström - guitar
 Henrik Sandelin - bass
 John Alfredsson - drums

Charts

References

2017 singles
2017 songs
MNRK Music Group singles